Brian Ball was a former Grand Prix motorcycle road racer. He competed in only one Grand Prix race during the 1968 Grand Prix motorcycle racing season, finishing the year in 12th place in the 500cc world championship. At the 1968 Isle of Man TT, he finished second to Giacomo Agostini in the Senior TT.

References

Year of birth missing (living people)
Living people
British motorcycle racers
500cc World Championship riders
Isle of Man TT riders